Kyle Wilson (born December 15, 1984) is a Canadian former professional Ice hockey centre who played in the National Hockey League (NHL) with the Washington Capitals, Columbus Blue Jackets and the Nashville Predators. Wilson played collegiate hockey for Colgate University, where he received a bachelor's degree in physics.

Playing career
Kyle Wilson was selected in the ninth round, 272nd overall, by the Minnesota Wild in the 2004 NHL Entry Draft. He made his NHL debut in 2009–10 season with the Washington Capitals where he scored 2 assists in 2 games and finished with a +1 rating.

On July 2, 2010, Wilson signed a one-year contract as a free agent with the Columbus Blue Jackets. He started the 2010–11 season with Columbus and after being scratched for the first 5 games he made his Blue Jackets debut on October 22 where he took 2 penalties and ended with a -2 in the first period during a 6-2 loss to Calgary. Wilson was moved to the fourth line taking the place of the injured Ethan Moreau and he picked up his first NHL goal on October 25 against Brian Boucher of the Philadelphia Flyers.

On July 5, 2011, Wilson signed a two-year contract with the Nashville Predators. The first season of the contract is worth $550,000 in the NHL and $105,000 in the AHL. The second season is a one-way contract worth $550,000.

After his first season with the Predators on June 15, 2012, Wilson was traded along with Anders Lindback and a seventh-round draft pick to the Tampa Bay Lightning for Sébastien Caron, two second-round draft picks and a third-round draft pick. In the midst of a disappointing 2012–13 season scoring only 5 goals in 22 games with Lightning affiliate, the Syracuse Crunch, Wilson was traded by Tampa Bay to the Anaheim Ducks in exchange for Dan Sexton on March 11, 2013.

On June 12, 2013, Dinamo Riga of the Kontinental Hockey League (KHL) announced that they have signed a contract with Kyle Wilson. After spending the 2013-14 season in Riga, he split the following campaign between Dinamo and fellow KHL side Traktor Chelyabinsk.

He started the 2015-16 campaign with Modo Hockey of the Swedish Hockey League (SHL) and parted company with the team in December 2015. He then represented German team Adler Mannheim at the 2015 Spengler Cup, before signing a deal for the remainder of the season with the SCL Tigers of the Swiss National League A (NLA) in March 2016.

As a free agent on July 21, 2016, Wilson moved to Germany to sign a one-year contract with Eisbären Berlin of the DEL.

Career statistics

Awards and honors

References

External links 

1984 births
Living people
Eisbären Berlin players
Canadian ice hockey centres
Colgate Raiders men's ice hockey players
Columbus Blue Jackets players
Dinamo Riga players
Hershey Bears players
Sportspeople from Oakville, Ontario
Milwaukee Admirals players
Minnesota Wild draft picks
Modo Hockey players
Nashville Predators players
Norfolk Admirals players
Ice hockey people from Ontario
San Antonio Rampage players
SCL Tigers players
South Carolina Stingrays players
Springfield Falcons players
Syracuse Crunch players
Traktor Chelyabinsk players
Washington Capitals players
Canadian expatriate ice hockey players in Latvia
Canadian expatriate ice hockey players in Germany
Canadian expatriate ice hockey players in Russia
Canadian expatriate ice hockey players in Switzerland
Canadian expatriate ice hockey players in Sweden